Blood Games may refer to:

Blood Games (film), 1990 slasher film directed by Tanya Rosenberg
Blood Games (book), 1992 true crime book by Jerry Bledsoe
Blood Games (novel) 1992 horror novel by Richard Laymon